A khanjali ( or ,  or , Armenian: Խանչալ (khanchal); or kinzhal when transliterating ) is a dagger, often with a single off-set groove on each face of the blade. The shape of the weapon is similar to that of the ancient Roman gladius, the Scottish dirk and the ancient Greek xiphos. Inhabitants of Georgia and of the rest of the Caucasus have used the khanjali as a secondary weapon since ancient times.

Such daggers and their scabbards are usually highly engraved with gold or silver designs, and sometimes include embedded gemstones. The scabbard will generally feature a ball point extension on the tip, and the handle is usually made of materials such as wood or ivory.

The 19th-century Russian poets Alexander Pushkin and Mikhail Lermontov both addressed celebrated poems to this weapon.

Name 
Name of the dagger Khanjali came into use from Persia (
قمه،خنجر), before that word Satevari was used in Georgia.

 In Georgia it's called Khanjali and Satevari
 In Daghestan it is called Khanjali
 In Armenia it is called Khanchal
 In Chechnya/Ingushetiya it is Shalta
 In Chircassia and Ossetia it is Kama (Qama).

History 
Earliest Khanjali in Georgia, dates back as far as 3rd century B.C. Its small size, reminiscent of the Roman gladius, is owed mainly to the fact that softness of copper and bronze it was originally made of did not allow for longer blades. Later, with introduction of steel, it became longer and narrower, However, its older version, called satevari, refused to give any ground, managing to survive three millennia and remain as a sidearm.

In the 18th and 19th centuries the production of Khanjali was at a high level in the Transcaucasia. Tbilisi was especially distinguished and well-known, from where such tools were supplied to other mountain peoples of the Caucasus, as well as Iran and other eastern regions. countries. That is not surprising, since Tbilisi was the capital of the Caucasus at that time, and both the client and the performer gathered in one place. Georgians as well as Dagestanis, Circassians, Armenians and others worked in Tbilisi. In the first half of the 19th century, Georgian Elizarashvili family was the most famous weaponry blacksmiths not only in the Caucasus but also in Iran, Turkey and Russia. Elizarashvili family lived in Tbilisi. Giorgi Elizarashvili inherited the family secrets of blacksmithing from his ancestors and passed on his knowledge and skills to his sons – Efrem and Karaman. The family maintained strictly the secrets of processing steel, but in 1828 Karaman shared the secret by the order of the Russian emperor Nicholas I,  and in return received a gold medal (with Anna ribbon) and 1000 Chervonets (high-value gold coins).

The usage of the Khanjali/Satevari in pre-marital relationships, termed as "sc'orproba(სწორპრობა)," was an intriguing and unusual Khevsur custom. During the night, a young couple may lie together with a Khanjali between them. Sexual activity between the two was absolutely prohibited. Anyone who disobeyed this rule was put to death.

References

Daggers
Medieval weapons
Military history of Georgia (country)